George Meyer (born in Chicago, Illinois) is an American former soccer coach who had two brief tenures as head coach of the United States men's national soccer team, in 1957 and 1965. He also led the American team in its attempt to qualify for the 1964 Olympics, managing to lose a game to Suriname.

He also coached Chicago Mustangs in 1968, the St. Louis Stars in 1971 and the Chicago Cats in 1976.

References

- Cirino, Antonio (Tony): US Soccer Vs The World, Damom Press, 1983;

External links
List of U.S. national team coaches

Year of birth missing (living people)
Living people
American soccer coaches
Sportspeople from Chicago
North American Soccer League (1968–1984) coaches
United States men's national soccer team managers